William or Bill Gunn may refer to:

Bill Gunn (footballer, born 1932) (1932–1991), Australian rules footballer for South Melbourne and Williamstown
Bill Gunn (footballer, born 1899) (1899–1970), Australian rules footballer for South Melbourne
Bill Gunn (Queensland politician, born 1895) (1895–1970), member of the Queensland Legislative Assembly for Wynnum
Bill Gunn (Queensland politician, born 1920) (1920–2001), Australian politician and former Queensland Deputy Premier
Bill Gunn (Massachusetts politician), Massachusetts candidate for United States House of Representatives
Bill Gunn (writer) (1934–1989), American playwright, novelist, actor and film director
Billy Gunn (born 1963), American professional wrestler
Will A. Gunn, American lawyer, former officer in the American armed forces
William Gunn (cricketer) (1858–1921), English Test cricketer and footballer
William Gunn (writer) (1750–1841), English miscellaneous writer
William Gunn (physician) (1855–1922), Florida's first black doctor
William Alphonsus Gunn (1760–1806), English evangelical cleric

See also
Bill Gunn Dam, structure at Lake Dyer in Australia, named for the politician